The 1946–47 Scottish Division B was won by Dundee who, along with second placed Airdrieonians, were promoted to Division A. Cowdenbeath finished bottom. It was the first season after World War II.

Events
Dundee (who had also won the previous season's equivalent division but were not promoted as it was still considered an unofficial wartime competition) recorded 10–0 victories in consecutive matches: against Alloa Athletic on 8 March, and Dunfermline Athletic on 22 March.

Table

References

External links
Scottish Football Archive

Scottish Division Two seasons
2
Scot